Kenneth Hayes Miller (March 11, 1876 – January 1, 1952) was an American painter, printmaker, and teacher.

Career
Born  in Oneida, New York, he studied at the Art Students League of New York with Kenyon Cox, Henry Siddons Mowbray and with William Merritt Chase at the New York School of Art. His early works were influenced by the paintings of his friend Albert Pinkham Ryder, and depict figures in phantasmagorical landscapes.

After 1920 Miller became interested in the underpainting-and-glazing techniques of the old masters, which he employed in painting contemporary scenes. He is especially noted for his many paintings of women shopping in department stores. The art historian M. Sue Kendall says: "In their classical poses and formalized compositions, Miller’s shoppers become ovoid and columnar forms in cloche hats and chokers, a study of geometricized volumes in space trying to inhabit a single shallow picture plane." Active as a printmaker throughout his career, Miller created many etchings, some of which reproduce his painted compositions. His work was part of the painting event in the art competition at the 1936 Summer Olympics.

Although he used traditional methods and was hostile to artistic modernism, Miller believed that good art is always radical in nature. He was a socialist, and intended his art to have a political dimension.

By the time of his death in New York City in 1952, his reputation was in eclipse, but he was rediscovered in the 1970s.

Students
Miller taught at the Art Students League  from 1911 until 1951.  His students include: Peggy Bacon, George Bellows, Isabel Bishop, Arnold Blanch, Patrick Henry Bruce, Minna Citron, John McCrady, Thelma Cudlipp, Horace Day, Dorothy Eaton, Arnold Friedman, Lloyd Goodrich, Josephine Hopper, Rockwell Kent, Yasuo Kuniyoshi, Emma Fordyce MacRae, Edward Middleton Manigault, Reginald Marsh, George L.K. Morris, Walter Tandy Murch,  Louise Emerson Ronnebeck, George Tooker, Russel Wright, Albert Pels, William C. Palmer, Molly Luce, and Helen Winslow Durkee.

Public collections

Collections where his works can be found include:
 Metropolitan Museum of Art, New York, New York
 Columbus Museum of Art, Columbus, Ohio
 Whitney Museum of American Art, New York, New York
 Georgia Museum of Art, Athens, GA
 Heckscher Museum of Art, Huntington, New York
 Phillips Collection, Washington, District of Columbia
 New Jersey State Museum, Trenton, New Jersey
 Los Angeles County Museum of Art, Los Angeles, California
 Wadsworth Atheneum, Hartford, Connecticut
 Art Gallery of Hamilton, Hamilton, Ontario, Canada
 New Britain Museum of American Art, New Britain, Connecticut
 Butler Institute of American Art, Youngstown, Ohio
 Smithsonian American Art Museum, Washington, District of Columbia
 Huntington Library, Art Collections and Botanical Gardens, San Marino, California
 Wichita Art Museum, Wichita, Kansas
 Smithsonian Institution, Hirshhorn Museum and Sculpture Garden, Washington, District of Columbia
 Speed Art Museum, Louisville, Kentucky

References

External links

Phillips Collection biography
Butler Institute biography
Two exhibition catalogs featuring Miller from The Metropolitan Museum of Art Libraries (fully available online as PDF)

19th-century American painters
American male painters
20th-century American painters
1876 births
1952 deaths
Art Students League of New York faculty
Art Students League of New York alumni
People from Oneida, New York
American tempera painters
Olympic competitors in art competitions
19th-century American male artists
20th-century American male artists